Judge Watson may refer to:

Albert Leisenring Watson (1876–1960), judge of the United States District Court for the Middle District of Pennsylvania
Derrick Watson (born 1966), judge of the United States District Court for the District of Hawaii
James Lopez Watson (1922–2001), judge of the United States Court of International Trade
Michael H. Watson (born 1956), judge of the United States District Court for the Southern District of Ohio

See also
Justice Watson (disambiguation)